Arthur Kenneth Reading (March 9, 1887 – March 1, 1971) was an American politician who served as Massachusetts Attorney General from 1927 to 1928.

Biography
Reading was born on March 9, 1887, in Williamsport, Pennsylvania.

Reading was a member of the Massachusetts House of Representatives from 1919 to 1922, he was the District Attorney of Middlesex County, Massachusetts, from 1923 to 1926 before being elected Attorney General in 1926.

Reading resigned as Attorney General on June 6, 1928, after the Massachusetts House of Representatives voted 196 to 18 to impeach him after he accepted $60,000 worth of bribes, the largest being a $25,000 bribe from Decimo Club, Inc.

He died on March 1, 1971, in Orlando, Florida.

External  links

References

1887 births
1971 deaths
District attorneys in Middlesex County, Massachusetts
Harvard Law School alumni
Massachusetts Attorneys General
Republican Party members of the Massachusetts House of Representatives
Politicians from Cambridge, Massachusetts
20th-century American politicians
United States officials impeached by state or territorial governments